The Netherlands competed at the 1976 Summer Olympics in Montreal, Quebec, Canada. 108 competitors, 72 men and 36 women, took part in 58 events in 11 sports.

Medalists
The Netherlands finished in 29th position in the final medal rankings, with two silver medals and three bronze medals.

Silver
 Herman Ponsteen — Cycling, Men's 4000m Individual Pursuit
 Eric Swinkels — Shooting, Men's Skeet Shooting

Bronze
 Enith Brigitha — Swimming, Women's 100m Freestyle
 Enith Brigitha — Swimming, Women's 200m Freestyle
 Alex Boegschoten, Ton Buunk, Piet de Zwarte, Andy Hoepelman, Evert Kroon, Nico Landeweerd, Hans Smits, Gijze Stroboer, Rik Toonen, Hans van Zeeland, and Jan Evert Veer — Water polo, Men's Team Competition

Athletics

Men's 800 metres
 Evert Hoving
 Heat — 1:48.99 (→ did not advance)

Men's 10.000 metres
 Jos Hermens
 Heat — 28:16.07
 Final — 28:25.04 (→ 10th place)

Men's Marathon
 Jos Hermens — 2:19:48 (→ 25th place)

Canoeing

Cycling

Twelve cyclists represented the Netherlands in 1976.

Individual road race
 Arie Hassink — 4:49:01 (→ 25th place)
 Leo van Vliet — 4:49:01 (→ 40th place)
 Ad Tak — 5:00:19 (→ 50th place)
 Frits Schür — did not finish (→ no ranking)

Team time trial
 Arie Hassink
 Frits Pirard
 Adri van Houwelingen
 Fons van Katwijk

Sprint
 Sjaak Pieters — 14th place

Individual pursuit
 Herman Ponsteen —  Silver Medal

Team pursuit
 Gerrit Möhlmann
 Peter Nieuwenhuis
 Herman Ponsteen
 Gerrie Slot

Equestrian

Gymnastics

Hockey

Men's team competition
Preliminary round (group A)
 Defeated India (3-1)
 Defeated Malaysia (2-0)
 Defeated Australia (2-1)
 Defeated Argentina (1-0)
 Defeated Canada (3-1)
Semi Finals
 Lost to Australia (1-2)
Bronze Medal Match
 Lost to Pakistan (2-3) → Fourth place

Team roster
Maarten Sikking (gk)
André Bolhuis (captain)
Tim Steens
Geert van Eijk
Theodoor Doyer
Coen Kranenberg
Rob Toft (gk)
Wouter Leefers
Hans Jorritsma
Hans Kruize
Jan Albers
Paul Litjens
Imbert Jebbink
Ron Steens
Bart Taminiau
Wouter Kan
Head coach: Wim van Heumen

Rowing

Sailing

Shooting

Swimming

Water polo

Men's team competition
Preliminary round (group B)
 Defeated Mexico (5-3)
 Defeated Soviet Union (3-2)
 Defeated Romania (6-5)
Final Round
 Defeated West Germany (3-2)
 Tied with Romania (4-4)
 Lost to Hungary (3-5)
 Defeated Yugoslavia (5-3)
 Tied with Italy (3-3) →  Bronze Medal

Team roster
Alex Boegschoten
Ton Buunk
Piet de Zwarte
Andy Hoepelman
Evert Kroon
Nico Landeweerd
Hans Smits
Gijze Stroboer
Rik Toonen
Hans van Zeeland
Jan Evert Veer

References

Nations at the 1976 Summer Olympics
1976 Summer Olympics
S